SFMA may refer to:

American Home Furnishings Alliance, formerly named Southern Furniture Manufacturers Association, a U.S. trade group
Miami metropolitan area, formerly known as the South Florida metropolitan area
Studien zu Fundmünzen der Antike, a German monograph series on archaeological numismatics